Szubin may refer to:

Places
Szubin, a town in Nakło County, Kuyavian-Pomeranian Voivodeship, Poland, located southwest of Bydgoszcz.
Gmina Szubin, or Szubin Commune, an urban-rural gmina (administrative district) in Nakło County, Kuyavian-Pomeranian Voivodeship, in north-central Poland
Szubin-Wieś, a village in the administrative district of Gmina Szubin, within Nakło County, Kuyavian-Pomeranian Voivodeship, in north-central Poland

Persons
Adam Szubin, American politician, served as US Secretary of the Treasury of the United States

See also
Szubina, a village in the administrative district of Gmina Krośniewice, within Kutno County, Łódź Voivodeship, in central Poland
Szubinianka Szubin, a football club from Szubin, Poland